Desperate Women may refer to:

 Desperate Women, 1978 television film, directed by Earl Bellamy, written by Jack B. Sowards
 Desperate Women, collection of stories by Michael Hemmingson

See also
 Desperate Housewives, American television series